Basketball at the 2018 Central American and Caribbean Games will be held at the Elias Chewing Coliseum in Barranquilla, Colombia. The women's tournament will last form the 20 to 24 July, whilst the men's tournament will last from the 29th of July to 3 August 2018.

Medal summary

Medal table

Events

Men's tournament
All times are local (UTC–5).

Group stage

Group A

Group B

Fifth to seventh place classification

5–7th place semifinal

Fifth place game

First to fourth place classification

Semifinals

Third place game

Final

Final standings

Women's tournament

Group stage

Group A

Group B

Fifth to eighth place classification

5–8th place semifinals

Seventh place game

Fifth place game

First to fourth place classification

Semifinals

Third place game

Final

Final standings

References

External links
2018 Central American and Caribbean Games – Basketball

Basketball
2018–19 in North American basketball
Basketball at the Central American and Caribbean Games
International basketball competitions hosted by Colombia